The Matrimony is a 2007 Chinese horror film directed by Teng Huatao and starring Leon Lai, Fan Bingbing, and Rene Liu. The movie was released on February 28, 2007.

Plot
Set during the 1930s, The Matrimony follows Shen Junchu (Leon Lai), a cinematographer that's deeply in love with his girlfriend Xu Manli (Fan Bingbing). Due to his extremely introverted character, Junchu was unable to confess to her how deeply he cared for her. When Manli dies in a freak car accident on the way to their date, Junchu mourns her deeply. Junchu's mother manages to convince him to marry Sansan (Rene Liu), but he is unwilling to allow her to take Manli's place in his heart. When Sansan discovers a mysterious attic room, she's forbidden to enter by Junchu. She eventually enters the room, only to find the ghost of Manli. Manli offers to help Sansan's unhappy relationship with Junchu, only for the ghost to grow dangerously jealous when Junchu begins to show an attraction for Sansan.

Cast
Leon Lai as Shen Junchu
Fan Bingbing as Xu Manli
Rene Liu as Sansan

Awards
 44th Golden Horse Film Awards 
Best Supporting Actress - Fan Bingbing  
Best Cinematography - Li Pingbin

Reception
Blogcritics criticized some parts of the film, such as some "obvious holes" and plot lulls, but stated that the film was interesting and beautifully shot. Variety praised the film, noting some similarities between the plot of Rebecca and The Matrimony. Dread Central gave the film three blades, writing that it "still manages to fall into the same quasi-supernatural trappings in its final act (including the aforementioned frustrating ending), but it sure is a touching date movie if nothing else." HorrorNews.net called The Matrimony "a fine example of a classic ghost story". A reviewer for the Tribeca Film Festival praised the film, citing the set designs and special effects as highlights. DVD Talk wrote that while the film was a "luxuriant, affective supernatural chiller", some of the twists in the film made it "less satisfying as a vision of subtle horror".

References

External links

 
 

2007 films
2007 horror films
Chinese supernatural horror films
Chinese ghost films
2000s Mandarin-language films
Films set in Shanghai
Films set in the 1930s
Films with screenplays by Zhang Jialu
Films directed by Teng Huatao